The 2010 United States elections were held on Tuesday, November 2, 2010, in the middle of Democratic President Barack Obama's first term. Republicans ended unified Democratic control of Congress and the presidency by winning a majority in the House of Representatives.

Republicans gained seven seats in the Senate (including a special election held in January 2010) but failed to gain a majority in the chamber. In the House of Representatives, Republicans won a net gain of 63 seats, the largest shift in seats since the 1948 elections. In state elections, Republicans won a net gain of six gubernatorial seats and flipped control of twenty state legislative chambers, giving them a substantial advantage in the redistricting that occurred following the 2010 United States Census. The election was widely characterized as a "Republican wave" election.

The heavy Democratic losses in 2010 were mainly attributed to the passing of the Affordable Care Act along with a poor economic recovery from The Great Recession and large budget deficits. This marked the first election since 1858 that yielded a Republican-controlled House and a Democratic-controlled Senate. This configuration was also in place for most of the 107th Congress, but on account of Senator Jim Jeffords' party switch rather than the election results.

Issues
Candidates and voters in 2010 focused on national economic conditions and the economic policies of the Obama administration and congressional Democrats. Attention was paid to public anger over the Wall Street bailout signed into law by President George W. Bush in late 2008. Voters were also motivated for and against the sweeping reforms of the health care system enacted by Democrats in 2010, as well as concerns over tax rates and record deficits. At the time of the election, unemployment was over 9%, and had not declined significantly since Barack Obama had become President. Further eroding public trust in Congress were a series of scandals that saw Democratic Representatives Charlie Rangel and Maxine Waters, as well as Republican Senator John Ensign, all accused of unethical and/or illegal conduct in the months leading up to the 2010 election.

The fiscally-focused and quasi-libertarian Tea Party movement was a vocal force in mobilizing voters for Republican candidates nationwide. Their widespread exposure in the media contributed to the election's focus on economic, rather than social, issues. In the opinion of Fox News political analyst Dick Morris, a "fundamental change" occurred in which social issues did not dominate Republican activism in 2010, because "economic and fiscal issues prevail. The Tea Party has made the Republican Party safe for libertarians."

Immigration reform had become an important issue in 2010, particularly following the passage of Arizona Senate Bill 1070, officially known as the Support Our Law Enforcement and Safe Neighborhoods Act. The Act greatly enhanced the power of Arizona's law enforcement agencies to investigate the immigration status of suspected illegal immigrants and to enforce state and national immigration laws. The Act also required immigrants to carry their immigration documentation on their person at all times. Its passage by a Republican-led legislature and its subsequent and very public signing by Jan Brewer, the Republican Governor of Arizona, ignited protests across the Southwest and galvanized political opinion among both pro-immigration Latino groups and Tea Party activists, many of whom supported stronger measures to stem illegal immigration.

The passage of the controversial Patient Protection and Affordable Care Act also contributed to the low approval ratings of Congress, particularly Democrats, in the months leading up to the election. Many Republicans ran on a promise to repeal the law, and beat incumbent Democratic opponents who had voted in favor of the Patient Protection and Affordable Care Act.

Federal elections

Congressional elections

Senate elections

On January 19, 2010, a special election was also held for the Class I seat in Massachusetts, as a result of the death of incumbent Senator Ted Kennedy. Republican Scott Brown won the seat.

The 34 seats in the United States Senate Class III were up for election. In addition, the Class I/II seats held by appointed Senators Ted Kaufman of Delaware, Kirsten Gillibrand of New York, and Carte Goodwin of West Virginia were contested in special elections on the same day. Republicans picked up six seats, but Democrats retained a majority in the Senate.

House of Representatives elections

All 435 voting seats in the United States House of Representatives were up for election. Additionally, elections were held to select the delegates for the District of Columbia and four of the five U.S. territories. The only seat in the House not up for election was that of the Resident Commissioner of Puerto Rico, who serves a four-year term and faced election in 2012. Republicans won the nationwide popular vote for the House of Representatives by a margin of 6.8 points and picked up 63 seats, taking control of the chamber for the first time since the 2006 elections. This represented the largest single-election shift in House seats since the 1948 elections and the largest midterm election shift since the 1938 elections. The only seat Democrats flipped was Delaware's lone congressional seat, going to former Lt. Governor John Carney.

State elections

Gubernatorial elections

37 state and two territory United States governors were up for election. Republicans picked up a net of six state governorships; Democrats won control of five governorships previously controlled by Republicans, but Republicans took 11 governorships.

Other statewide elections
In many states where the following positions are elected offices, voters elected state executive branch offices (including Lieutenant Governors (though some will be voted for on the same ticket as the gubernatorial nominee), Secretary of state, state Treasurer, state Auditor, state Attorney General, state Superintendent of Education, Commissioners of  Insurance, Agriculture or, Labor, etc.) and state judicial branch offices (seats on state Supreme Courts and, in some states, state appellate courts).

State legislative elections

All states except Louisiana, Mississippi, New Jersey and Virginia held elections for their state legislatures. Republicans made substantial gains in state legislatures across the nation. Twenty chambers flipped from Democratic to Republican control, giving Republicans full control of eleven state legislatures and control of one chamber in Colorado, Iowa and New York.1 Additionally, Republicans gained enough seats in the Oregon House to produce a 30-30 party split, pushing Democrats into a power-sharing agreement that resulted in the election of two "co-speakers" (one from each party) to lead the chamber. Republicans gained a total of 680 seats in state legislative races, breaking the previous record of 628 flipped seats set by Democrats in the post-Watergate elections of 1974.

Six states saw both chambers switch from Democrat to Republican majorities: Alabama (where the Republicans won a majority for the first time in 136 years), Maine (for the first time since 1964), Minnesota, New Hampshire, North Carolina (for the first time since 1896), and Wisconsin. In addition, by picking up the lower chambers in Indiana, Ohio, Michigan, Montana and Pennsylvania, Republicans gained control of both chambers in an additional five states. Further, Republicans picked up one chamber from Democrats in Colorado, Iowa, and New York to split control in those states. They expanded majorities in both chambers in Texas, Florida, and Georgia. The massive Republican victories in legislative races would be widely expected to have a major impact on the redrawing of congressional districts for the 2012 election cycle.

One of the few bright spots for Democrats was retaining their majorities in both the California and Illinois legislatures.

Local elections
On November 2, 2010, various cities, counties, school boards, and special districts (in the United States) witnessed elections. Some elections were high-profile.
 Luzerne County, Pennsylvania: The voters of Luzerne County adopted a home rule charter by a margin of 51,413 to 41,639. This changed the county’s government from a board of county commissioners to a council-manager form of government. The following year (in 2011), the first general election for the new assembly was held. The first council members were sworn in on January 2, 2012.

High-profile mayoral elections are listed below:
 Honolulu, Hawaii: Incumbent mayor Mufi Hannemann resigned on July 20, 2010, to run for Governor of Hawaii. The city's Managing Director Kirk Caldwell served as acting mayor until Peter Carlisle was elected in a special election on September 18.
 Louisville, Kentucky: Incumbent mayor Jerry Abramson declined to run for a third consecutive term in order to run for Lieutenant Governor of Kentucky in 2011. Greg Fischer was elected as the successor.
 New Orleans, Louisiana: Incumbent mayor Ray Nagin was term-limited out of office. Mitch Landrieu was elected as the new mayor on February 6.
 Washington, D.C: Incumbent mayor Adrian Fenty was defeated in the Democratic primary by Vincent C. Gray, who then went on to win the general election.

Turnout
Approximately 82.5 million people voted. Turnout increased relative to the last U.S. midterm elections without any significant shift in voters' political identification.

Table of federal and state results

Bold indicates a change in control. Note that not all states held gubernatorial, state legislative, and United States Senate elections in 2010.

Notes

References

Further reading
 
 Bullock, Charles S., et al. Key States, High Stakes: Sarah Palin, the Tea Party, and the 2010 Elections (2011)
 
 Sabato, Larry. Who Got in the Booth? A Look Back at the 2010 Elections (2011)

External links

 2010 Midterm Election Debates on C-SPAN
 Wesleyan Media Project: 2010 Political Advertising Analysis at Wesleyan University
National newspapers
 Elections 2010 at The New York Times
 Campaign 2010 at The Washington Post
National radio
 Election 2010 at NPR
National TV
 2010 Election at ABC News
 Campaign 2010 on C-SPAN
 Campaign 2010 at CBS News
 Election Center at CNN
 Elections at Fox News
 Decision 2010 at MSNBC

 
2010
2010
November 2010 events in the United States